An overwrap or wrap is a method of sealing a contained product, typically as part of retail packaging.   It is often made of plastic film (sometimes called polywrapping) or paper.  The wrap is applied over the bare product or can be applied over another form of packaging. It is typically used to protect products, but can be used decoratively.

Functions
An overwrap can be used for several purposes or functions:
Combine two or more smaller packages into a larger multi-pack
 Keep a package or item clean
 Help prevent package pilferage or premature opening of the package
 Help provide a tamper indicating seal
 Help keep insects out of a package
 Obscure a package for distribution, sale, or gifting
 Help provide an authentication seal
 Help provide grease resistance or water resistance
 Keep an item, such as magazines, clean and intact during shipment; provide an address label that does not damage the item
 Provide graphics, advertising, warnings, instructions, bar codes, etc.

Types of overwraps

Shrink wrap

Shrink wrap is a material made up of polymer plastic film. When heat is applied it shrinks tightly over whatever it is covering. Heat can be applied with a hand held heat gun (electric or gas) or the product and film can pass through a heat tunnel. Most shrink films are polyethylene.

Film wrap
Plastic films, usually polyethylene or polypropylene, can be wrapped around an item and attached with adhesive, PSA tape, or heat seals. Sometimes the film is in the form of a plastic bag which is sealed around the item.

Decorative wrap
Wraps can be either exclusively for visual appeal (decoration) or be protective in nature but encompass a decorative element such as a printed design.

Paper wrap
Kraft paper and a variety of other papers can be used to overwrap items in a package or to overwrap a package. Some papers provide abrasion protection for packaged items. Sealing can be by adhesive, tapes, heat seals, etc.  Some papers also have grease resistance or are saturated with volatile corrosion inhibitors, etc.

See also
 Shrink wrap
 Plastic wrap
 Plastic bag

References

 Soroka, W, "Fundamentals of Packaging Technology", IoPP, 2002, 
 Yam, K. L., "Encyclopedia of Packaging Technology", John Wiley & Sons, 2009, 

Packaging